The three-striped warbler (Basileuterus tristriatus) is a species of bird in the family Parulidae. It was previously considered conspecific with the Tacarcuna warbler and the black-eared warbler. This bird is found in South America from Venezuela to Peru. The Yungas warbler (Basileuterus punctipectus) was previously considered a subspecies.

Description

The three-striped warbler measures  in length.  It is mostly olive-brown with a buffy belly and underparts.  It has distinct black and white striping on the head and a dark cheek.  Male and female three-striped warblers have similar plumages.

Their song is a rapid series of squeaky chirps.

Distribution and habitat

It is found in Bolivia, Colombia,  Ecuador, Peru, and Venezuela. Its natural habitats are subtropical or tropical moist montane forests and heavily degraded former forest.  The three-striped warbler typically forages on the ground, especially near riparian areas.

References

Basileuterus
Taxonomy articles created by Polbot